Salar is a town in Tashkent Region, Uzbekistan. It is part of Qibray District. The town population in 1989 was 25,521 people.

The town is home to the Inter Rohat brewery.

References

Populated places in Tashkent Region
Urban-type settlements in Uzbekistan